Indigenous archaeology is a sub-discipline of Western archaeological theory that seeks to engage and empower indigenous people in the preservation of their heritage and to correct perceived inequalities in modern archaeology. It also attempts to incorporate non-material elements of cultures, like oral traditions, into the wider historical narrative. This methodology came out of the global anti-colonial movements of the 1970s and 1980s led by aboriginal and indigenous people in settler-colonial nations, like the United States, Canada, and Australia. Major issues the sub-discipline attempts to address include the repatriation of indigenous remains to their respective peoples, the perceived biases that western archaeology's imperialistic roots have imparted into its modern practices, and the stewardship and preservation of indigenous people's cultures and heritage sites. This has encouraged the development of more collaborative relationships between archaeologists and indigenous people and has increased the involvement of indigenous people in archaeology and its related policies.

As a relatively recently formed variety of archaeology, the "tenets and practices of Indigenous archaeology are currently being defined", and, as a sub-discipline, it is "unavoidably pluralistic, contingent, and emergent". Changes in practices under what is called indigenous archeology may range from Indigenous peoples being consulted about archaeological research and the terms of non-Native researchers, to instances of Native-designed and directed exploration of their "own" heritage.

The explosion of development-related cultural resources management (CRM) archaeology has prompted many Aboriginal organizations to get involved. They have worked to translate their cultural and archaeological values into heritage management plans that supplant the colonial status quo. Beyond field-based applications, Indigenous archaeology can empower Indigenous peoples as they work toward decolonization of society in general and of archaeology in particular. It has generated considerable controversy among scholars, some of whom support the concept in principle, but believe that incorporation of certain indigenous viewpoints has led to "major constraints on the research" of historical indigenous peoples.

Potential biases in Western archaeology 
The modern science of archaeology involves the collection and study of material objects like human remains and culturally or historically significant items. This practice has its origins in European colonial policies. Many historical items obtained throughout the 18th and 19th centuries were acquired from colonized third world nations by European or American scientists and explorers. Some items were paid for, but many were excavated from indigenous lands without the consultation or permission of the people to whom the items were culturally significant. In the case of human remains, there are many documented instances of indigenous bodies being removed from battlefields or from burial sites by researchers during this time period. Many of these bodies were used to assemble collections for the purpose of biological and cultural studies. At the time, many bodies were also used by European and American scientists as evidence in the creation of racial classification systems.

Modern archaeological practices ensure the items obtained from excavations are through legal means. The knowledge obtained from the study of these artifacts can offer many historical insights in a wide variety of fields. For instance, human remains can give information on topics from the migration patterns of ancient humans to the evolution and spread of modern diseases. Acquiring this information requires historical artifacts or remains to study. Indigenous communities are often not included or consulted in this process, and the desires of local communities can be marginalized. Findings are often not shared with the communities artifacts are obtained from, and many old artifacts are stored in museum collections for extended periods of time without being used.

Development 
Much of the tension between archeologists and First Nations in the Americas has arisen because the latter believe that "current heritage ethics and values almost exclusively reflect the values and beliefs of Euro-Americans." Mainstream archaeology has been complicit in variously objectifying, denigrating, and ignoring native people as it pursues the study of their past. Some scholars think that Native people have become estranged from their archaeological heritage because European-American scholars made an artificial distinction between prehistory and history that denies connection between contemporary cultures and archaeological ones. The social disruptions of Native American cultures due to losses from disease, warfare and encroachment of colonization resulted in many cases in the severing of their traditions of history keeping. By the time formal studies in archeology began, several centuries of Indigenous history had been dismissed and/or distorted by the new settlers, who became the colonial custodians.

As a result of discarded indigenous narratives, colonialist perspectives dominated the academic discourse and evaluated the indigenous history as a separate and less significant extension of the contemporary culture. The viewpoints of colonialist empires impressed predispositions and assumptions regarding indigenous culture and history, whether by destroying indigenous property, seizing land, or using state-sponsored propaganda and education to reinterpret the legacy of indigenous groups. Furthermore, access to archaeological findings and the means to correct biased or misleading portrayals of indigenous culture were limited by the relative lack of indigenous scholars participating directly in archaeology. The means of correcting and recovering the indigenous narrative are thus further damaged, and the imperialist-aligned interpretation of history is codified in the academics and archaeological practice. Colonialist views on indigenous culture are subsequently ingrained in the education system and the populace itself (Sonya 2006).

The legacy of anthropologists and archaeologists "behaving badly" with respect to native people has affected 21st century relations. For instance, indigenous peoples pushed for passage by the US Congress of the Native American Graves Protection and Repatriation Act (NAGPRA), due to their strong dissatisfaction with the conduct of archaeologists. In their pursuit of science, they overrode strong cultural traditions associated with grave sites and artifacts. Similarly, in Canada the legislature passed the Heritage Conservation Act (1994). Provincial governments have recognised that local First Nations had an interest in being consulted in the archaeological permit application process. In many cases, consultation has arranged for additional roles for them and sometimes become vehicles for community and economic development.

Debate about indigenous concerns about archeology have been related to criticism of 20th-century post-structuralist and post-modernist approaches in the writing of history. Rossiter and Wood, and Windschuttle are among those who do not believe that Western enlightenment thought and "neo-liberal capitalist frameworks" can be applied in a blanket manner to Indigenous cultural heritage. Similarly, scholars such as Cooper, Yellowhorn and Wylie have re-ignited fundamental debates that contrast the role and status of science against the role and status of Indigenous knowledge.

Such scholars increasingly find fault with science's "universalizing myth" and its allegedly objective "view from nowhere", its appeal to pan-human values and reliance on empirical modes of understanding. . Many agree with philosopher Alison Wylie in accepting empiricism as one route to productive knowledge, while finding "no reason to conclude that this insulates the scientific enterprise or its products from political, moral, or social scrutiny, much less establishes that scientific interests have a transcendent value that takes precedence over all other interests". (see also Forsman 1997 and White Deer 1997).

Since the activism associated with the late twentieth century, Indigenous peoples have worked to develop strategies to use, protect, research and manage their cultural heritage. Indigenous archaeology is just one among the tools they are using to reclaim their heritage.

Internalist archaeology 
Eldon Yellowhorn (2006) has written about what is called internalist archaeology. Primarily but not exclusively for the benefit of Native people, the internalist perspective has overturned the late 19th century, Eurocentric theory that the Native peoples were disappearing for good, or that they were unrelated to the ancient archaeological remains, or both (Yellowhorn 2006: 197). Internalism practitioners reconsider basic archaeological conventions that can carry connotations distasteful to First Nations and others. An example is what Yellowhorn calls "chronological oppression", that is, the European-American emphasis on a dichotomy between prehistory and history (the latter first documented by evidence in writing.(2006: 198).

Internalism encourages reclaiming by indigenous peoples of the archaeological record, and thus their connections to land, spirit and power. It treats oral narrative as a kind of middle-range theory (Yellowhorn 2006: 205), drawing on mythology’s established mnemonic role of "connecting higher with lower levels of abstraction" (Yellowhorn 2006: 202). Because internalism focuses on specific cultural traditions, for instance, using established archaeological methods to "search for the signatures" of oral narratives in the local archaeological record (Yellowhorn 2006: 137), it has appealed to Native practitioners and publics. Such an approach values a local understanding of history and is also grounded firmly in a global anthropological context. Yellowhorn says that it is best achieved through the "development of applicable theoretical frameworks borne of rigorous professionalism" (Yellowhorn 2006: 195).

Archaeology and national politics
The importance of archaeological sites and materials to Indigenous peoples’ case for their uninterrupted occupation of colonized lands cannot be overestimated: "control of cultural property is central to the struggle of decolonization, aboriginal self-government, and in some areas, First Nations cultural survival" (Walker and Ostrove 1995: 14). As archeology provides incontrovertible material related to past events, First Nations peoples are beginning to consider archeology as a practice they can use, rather than as a colonialist project or bureaucratic obstacle course. Archaeological sites and objects may serve the philosophy and process of decolonization; for instance, being used to negotiate land claims or to promote cultural cohesion. Indigenous groups have begun to insist on control of such resources in their transition toward self-determination (Walker and Ostrove 1995). A relationship is seen between archaeology and nationalism. According to Kohl and Fawcett, as well as Trigger, such a relationship is "not necessarily corrupt or intrinsically suspect", any more than it was when European-Americans were making all the decisions about archeological sites and materials.(Kohl and Fawcett 1995: 3; also Trigger 1983).

Scholars generally support the rights of Indigenous peoples to the sites and materials created and used by their ancestors. Canadian First Nations, and others in like circumstances, "hold better jurisdictional title", thus legislative authority, to heritage resources than either Canada or the provinces (Asch 1997: 66). Yet the disposition of these areas continues to challenge governments: “given the intellectual and political traditions of historically and colonially established behaviour still influential in nominally post-colonial societies, any change becomes an issue of national and inherently contested politics” (Boyd et al. 2005: 92). So while the care and management of heritage materials and sites is often among those areas first offered up by colonial governments at modern negotiating tables, few accommodations are made for the attendant financial demands and regulative license required for these transfers of responsibility (Mohs 1994).

Self-determination 
In once-colonial nations, the efforts of current governments to reconcile with First Nations people is having direct effects on the practical and legal aspects of stewardship of archaeological resources. Waves of globally and federally endorsed recognition of Aboriginal rights in general, and of heritage stewardship in particular, are pounding the shores of nominally post-colonial governments (see, for example, Ritchie [1994] on Australia, Watkins [2003] and Wylie [1999] on Canada and the United States, and Whitelaw [2005] on South Africa). Domestic commitments to honourable negotiation (e.g., Canada's Royal Commission on Aboriginal Peoples [1996] and British Columbia's New Relationship with Aboriginal Peoples [2005]) and a flush of heritage-specific pledges to more fully accommodate Native interests (e.g., World Archaeological Congress 1990, Canadian Archaeological Association 1997, Society for American Archaeology 1990) are reinvigorating the debate about the values, roles and responsibilities related to heritage stewardship.

The contributions of the indigenous viewpoint to archaeology also aid in addressing the problems of race that are integrated into the practice. The archaeological discourse can take a patronizing and judgmental interpretation of indigenous practices and artifacts without proper context, often portraying indigenous culture as comparatively flawed or inferior in technique and technology. These construe the notion of indigenous culture as particularly alien and foreign, building a racist image to the non-indigenous viewpoint. The incorporation of the indigenous viewpoint in the academics can normalize their culture in the overall historical narrative, and shift away from portraying indigenous peoples as "savage", and instead evaluate them equally with other world cultures (Echo-Hawk 2006).

The indigenous narrative is significantly influenced by the colonialist tendency to homogenize indigenous culture into one single entity. The contemporary historical sequence focuses on the fall of indigenous cultures as a result of the advent of empires, and portrays the end segment of their history as the only significant contribution. For example, the colonization of the Americas in Central and South America neglect the long history of the Aztec and Incan empires, and only associates those cultures with defeat in the context of colonization. The complex political and economic infrastructure and achievements of those indigenous societies, and their legacy leading up to that point, is discarded in the narrow scope of the colonial achievement. Additionally, characterizing the indigenous history as an era of collective defeat fails to distinguish between individual indigenous cultures, cutting off their own histories and obscuring the features unique to each society (Oland 2012).

Indigenous and mainstream archaeologies

Applications 
As Indigenous archaeology unfolds, two things are becoming clear that serve to highlight some of the principle similarities and differences between Indigenous and non-Indigenous perspectives. First, most Indigenous archaeologies hold the view that archaeology makes up only one part of the cultural resources spectrum (Anyon 1991). The inclusion of spiritual, traditional use, linguistic and historical studies are influencing the direction of heritage research and management, just as anthropology's standard four-field approach has done for archaeology. In both traditions, "intellectual and material aspects of these cultural practices are nearly impossible to separate and an attempt to do so threatens or undermines the practices themselves" (Smith and Jackson 2006: 312). Second, where archaeology and Indigenous archaeology diverge, is on the issue of human remains. These, according to most Indigenous practitioners and publics, are not the same as other kinds of cultural resources, their use and disposition should not be subject to the regulations or negotiations. However, archaeologists need them for their research and to advance society's knowledge. This divide stems from how many people in both groups see the world. Scientists are trained in western schools of thought, which portrays time as linear. People beyond a couple generations into the past are seen as long gone, and it is less taboo to study their remains. In contrast, many indigenous cultures see time as circular and deceased ancestors as a current members of their society. In recent years the political climate has favored indigenous people. Many major European and American universities and museums have returned stored remains to indigenous communities around the world.

Despite, or perhaps because of, these differences, Indigenous archaeology should not be seen as exclusive to Indigenous peoples. It has wide relevance outside Indigenous communities (Atalay 2006), where post-colonial methodology is wanting in quantity and quality. The practice of Indigenous archaeology provides non-Native people with a tool by which they may aid in the larger project of decolonization and reclamation of minority rights and identities. It actively recognizes the special rights, interests and responsibilities that Native people have in the realm of cultural heritage (e.g., Anyon 1991, L.T. Smith 2005, Wilson 2007; Yellowhorn 1996). Indigenous archaeology has become part of the greater transformative project of Indigenous research "that is active in pursuit of social and institutional change, that makes space for Indigenous knowledge, and that has a critical view of power relations and inequality" (L.T. Smith 2005: 89).

Managing differences 
Negotiating the difference in Indigenous and non-Indigenous perspective, of course, entails an "increasingly holistic engagement…with modern native peoples who are direct heirs to the traditions they are studying" (Trigger 1990: 781-782), which is changing the whole thrust of archaeological practice and stewardship. Conservative factions in archaeology (e.g. McGhee 2008) are finding the risk of infidelity to the archaeological record too great to sanction an Indigenous archaeology, believing the endeavour to be too subjective to be considered archaeology. Abdicating the use of archaeology's unique set of methods for interpreting the past in favour of alternative lines of evidence (e.g. oral history, genealogical studies) is, critics argue, setting up competing, even incompatible, versions of history.

The disparity between the indigenous and non-indigenous interpretations of archaeological conduct may be addressed by the integration of indigenous perspective in explaining artifacts and observations initially made by non-indigenous archaeologists. The intent and historical background of particular historical remnants offered by the indigenous perspective can assist in the contemporary archaeological approach. For example, the rationale behind choice of material and method used in constructing historical artifacts would allow a fairer evaluation of indigenous technology to be seen in the historical narrative. In the same way, an archaeological approach headed by indigenous researchers could benefit from the input of non-indigenous research. A responsible and equitable account of indigenous history requires that the narratives of different cultures is taken into consideration by the parties involved (Croes 2010).

The late, eminent Canadian theoretician Bruce Trigger suggested archaeologists continue to rigorously evaluate each history based on "evidence of greater or lesser completeness and accuracy and on more or less sound reasoning" (1997: ix). Advocating a continued use of careful, objective assessment of such qualities can help integrate different aspects of the past into a more complete, holistic picture of history (ibid). The anthropological-Indigenous collaborative model inevitably raises hackles because at some point, somebody's truth is going to have to be truer than someone else's to move forward (or it will be presented as such; Cooper 2006). Where archaeologists' version of events contradicts First Nations' beliefs about their history, is each obliged to challenge others' myth-building? "If archaeologists knowingly treat the beliefs of Indian differently from those of Euro-Canadians," writes Trigger, "there is a danger that the discipline will descend into mythography, political opportunism, and bad science" (x). While he asserts that "the only morally defensible option" (x) in such cases is to report the truth (as far as it can be known), the real, social implications this could have on relationships predicated on goodwill and respect may be severe. Trigger acknowledges the influence that both cultural relativism and the great white guilt have on archaeologists looking to do the right thing, but maintains that above all, archaeology must retain the scientific method if it can hope to "refute claims being made by fascists, sexists, racists, and Indian-haters" (x). He insists that archaeologists have a responsibility not only to educate people, but to do so "honestly and frankly" (x) and to credit individuals with the ability to form their own opinions.

Indigenous archaeology in practice 
As the values and goals of descendent communities are incorporated into the structure of heritage management, a different picture of heritage stewardship should emerge. Where the Western mode is predicated on ideas of the public trust, the Indigenous stewardship paradigm is more often concerned with the care of living history (Smith and Burke 2003: 183-185; also Lawson 1997, Watkins 2003). Assigning custody of heritage on the basis of cultural patrimony respects the "traditionally, or historically, legitimate cultural or spiritual responsibility for the cultural property at hand" (Meskell 2002: 291), and infuses stewardship with a duty of familial care. The differences between the "public trust" school of archaeological thought, and the "cultural legacy" perspective of Indigenous thought have cognitive implications: the former isolates history, failing to link it with other people, places or times, while the latter binds the studied past with the present and future. The distinction can be as simple a matter as considering an archaeological skeletal specimen as object or ancestor (Smith and Burke 2003: 184-185). Or, it can be as complex as demonstrating continuity by drawing one's past on the landscape for a world that relies on discontinuities to order time and space.

Controlling and preserving culturally significant archaeological materials and shaping the discourse around their history are the other primary issues of indigenous archaeology. The fact based nature of archaeology as a science leads it to value sources that do not have hard evidence, like material information or data, less than those that do. Indigenous archaeology sees this approach as biasing the historical narrative because excludes cultures with non-material methods of preserving history, like oral traditions, from contribution as much to the historical narrative. It advocates for methods similar to the Four field approach in anthropology to negate this perceived bias.

Legislation around the stewardship and preservation of archaeological and cultural sites is perceived to be similarly biased as well. It is seen as favoring sites that have physical objects there, and often requires them to be relatively untouched by the modernization. This excludes many sites of cultural or religious value to many indigenous communities. Many of these communities are either unwilling or unable to pay for the upkeep of sites that legislation does protect, so archaeologists are brought in to do so. This may cause conflict between the two groups, since archaeologists may use invasive methods of preservation that conflict with the desires or traditions of the local community. In response to this, programs for the training of indigenous people in archaeological practices in order to allow them to consult on ongoing dig sites and the consultation of local communities before archaeological experiments begin have become more widespread. Cultural resources management (CRM) programs, along with expanded collegiate resources and museum programs in this area are helping to engage local communities and work to address these perceived biases.

Global impact 
Watkins (2005) presents an overview of the gradual progress of the Indigenizing of archaeology worldwide, lauding the few accomplishments and trying to "interpret the relative quiet of the Indigenous voice" (40). In Australia and New Zealand, Aboriginal peoples are using archeology as part of their reclamation of heritage and assertion of indigenous rights, where it is increasingly used in support of land claims and repatriation issues (39). The Canadian experience follows a similar trajectory, albeit at a slower pace. Specific examples of unambiguously successful Canadian collaborative projects include the partnership in British Columbia between SCES and Simon Fraser University (SFU). Another was the DNA and other studies associated with Kwaday Dan Ts’inchi, the 500-year-old remains called "Long Ago Man Found", "discovered by sheep hunters in 1999 at the foot of a melting glacier in Tatshenshini-Alsek Park in the Yukon". There was also cooperation on his reburial.(Watkins 2005: 35).

The value of indigenous communities is taking becoming greater in archaeological projects that work with sensitive artifacts and cultural remnants, though conflict between contemporary and indigenous approaches still exist. For example, the integration of indigenous permissions in studying sites, such as Massachusetts's 1983 Unmarked Burial Law, assists in providing indigenous communities a measure of control over archaeological studies. However, indigenous communities dispute on whether or not their cultural practices should be subject to academic and legalistic judgement by external scholars. The demands on indigenous peoples concerning archaeological collaboration involve more burdens on the indigenous community to answer to archaeological probing, while traditional archaeological approaches do not change and fail to accommodate to indigenous needs (Matthews 2009).

The regions of Mesoamerica and South America are beginning the dialogue of indigenous interests in archaeology, which there as elsewhere takes a backseat to more pressing efforts to secure basic rights for First Peoples. The nations of Scandinavia have made minimal progress in considering the archaeology of the Sami people as a field of study, let alone involving the descendent populations in projects (Watkins 2005:38). In Africa, attention is focused on fundamental economic and human rights issues, which has forced the issue of indigenous participation in archaeology to the back compared to the status in developed nations (Watkins 2005:39).

See also 
Archaeology
Cultural Heritage
Intellectual property issues in cultural heritage (IPinCH)

References

Footnotes

Bibliography 
Books

Academic Anthology Articles

 
 
 
 
 
 
 
 
 
 
 
 
 
 
 
 
 
 
 
 
 

Academic Journal Articles

 
 
 
 
 
 
 
 
 
 
 
 
 
 
 
 
 

Governmental and organisational publications

Other

External links 
 Archaeology Without Reserve: Indigenous Heritage Stewardship Project homepage
 Indigenous involvement in environmental and heritage management (Australia)
 Intellectual property issues in cultural heritage (IPinCH)
 Protocols for Native American Archival Materials
 World Archaeological Congress

Public archaeology
Indigenous rights
Cultural heritage